Earth is the fourth album by American rock band Jefferson Starship. The album was recorded in 1977, with the same band lineup as the previous album, Spitfire and released in 1978.

The band had not toured in 1977, partly due to Marty Balin's reluctance to commit to the band. The song "Count on Me" became a Top 10 single, peaking at No. 8. The album hit No. 5 on the Billboard charts. A US and European tour followed. A riot in West Germany occurred after the band decided not to play without Grace Slick, who was inebriated. They lost their guitars and equipment during the riot and played one more tense show on West German TV in Hamburg, after which Slick left the band for one album. Marty Balin led the band for one more show at a Genesis concert at the Knebworth Festival in England using rented equipment. When they returned to the US, drummer John Barbata left the band after a serious car accident. This would be the end of the 1970s line-up and several new members joined the band, as well as a new record producer. Success of this album led to Jefferson Starship being contracted to provide a song for the Star Wars Holiday Special.

Track listing

Charts

Personnel
Marty Balin – lead (2, 4, 6, 8) and backing vocals
Grace Slick – lead (1, 3, 5, 7) and backing vocals, piano (7)
Paul Kantner – lead (9) and backing vocals, rhythm guitar
Craig Chaquico – lead guitar, rhythm guitar (1, 4, 5, 7)
David Freiberg – bass (1-4, 6, 7), organ (5, 8, 9), backing vocals
Pete Sears – bass (5, 8, 9), electric piano (1), organ (1-4, 6, 7), Moog (1, 5, 9), synthesizer (1), piano (2-4, 6), celeste (2), clavinet (4, 6), backing vocals
John Barbata – drums, congas, percussion, backing vocals

Additional Personnel
Gene Page – strings, horns
Jesse Barish – background vocals

Production
Jefferson Starship – producer, arrangements, art direction
Larry Cox – producer, engineer
David Frazer – assistant engineer
Steve Hall – recordist
Pat Ieraci (Maurice) – production coordinator, art coordination
Nat Quick – illustration
Bill Thompson – manager
Paul Dowell – amp consultant
Cynthia Bowman – art coordination
Bill Laudner – art assistant
Gribbitt (Tim Bryant) – art director
Don Davis – Earth dust sleeve illustration, Earth label illustration
Roger Rossmeyer – photography
Recorded and Mixed at Wally Heider, San Francisco
Strings and Horns arranged by Gene Page, Whitney Recording Studio, Glendale
Mastered by John Golden at Kendun Recorders, Burbank

Singles
"Count on Me" (3/11/78) #8 US
"Runaway" (5/27/78) #12 US
"Crazy Feelin'" (9/9/78) #54 US

References

External links

1978 albums
Albums recorded at Wally Heider Studios
Grunt Records albums
Jefferson Starship albums
Albums arranged by Gene Page